The Roman Catholic Church of the Most Precious Blood is a Roman Catholic church of the Personal Ordinariate of Our Lady of Walsingham, on O'Meara Street in Southwark, London, SE1.

The church and its adjoining presbytery, forecourt walls and shrine have been listed Grade II on the National Heritage List for England since 2014. The shrine outside the church to Our Lady of Lourdes (or Our Lady of All Nations) was dedicated in 1957. It is made from Sicilian marble and stands in a niche lined with flint from Norfolk.
The church serves the Parish of the Most Precious Blood which was established in 1891 by the Bishop of Southwark, John Baptist Butt upon a bequest of £10,000. The church was designed by the architect Frederick Walters and the combined cost of the construction of the church and adjoining presbytery was £7,000.

Denis Evinson, in his book Catholic Churches of London, described the interior as "...a joy to enter, warm, welcoming and uncluttered by busy detail".

The two bells of the church were made in the Whitechapel Bell Foundry and installed in 1956. The Stations of the Cross that adorn the walls of the interior were made from terracotta by the Swiss artist .

In 2013, the parish joined the Personal Ordinariate of Our Lady of Walsingham.

References

External links

1891 establishments in England
1891 in London
19th-century Roman Catholic church buildings in the United Kingdom
Arts and Crafts architecture in England
Frederick Walters buildings
Church of the Most Precious Blood
Grade II listed churches in London
Roman Catholic churches completed in 1892
Roman Catholic churches in the London Borough of Southwark
Romanesque Revival church buildings in England
Personal ordinariates